Clive Llewellyn (born 27 March 1953) is a Canadian wrestler and lawyer. He competed in the men's freestyle 68 kg at the 1976 Summer Olympics.

References

External links
 

1953 births
Living people
Canadian male sport wrestlers
Olympic wrestlers of Canada
Wrestlers at the 1976 Summer Olympics
People from Uasin Gishu County
Pan American Games medalists in wrestling
Pan American Games silver medalists for Canada
Wrestlers at the 1975 Pan American Games